Antonio Catricalà (7 February 1952 – 24 February 2021) was an Italian public manager, politician, professor, lawyer, and magistrate.

Biography
Catricalà graduated with honors in law from the University of Rome "La Sapienza". He later won the competition in ordinary magistracy, and passed the qualifying exam as a lawyer. Subsequently, he became, by competition, councilor and section president of the Italian Council of State. He also taught private law in the faculty of law of the University of Rome Tor Vergata.

He was president of the Italian Competition Authority from 9 March 2005 to 16 November 2011. On 18 November 2010, he was appointed chair of the Authority for electricity and gas, but he gave up the appointment a few days later to remain President of the Antitrust.

On 16 November 2011, he was appointed Undersecretary of State to the Presidency of the Council of Ministers acting as Council Secretary in the Monti Cabinet. On 2 May 2013, he was appointed Deputy Minister to the Ministry of Economic Development in the Letta Cabinet with responsibility for communications.

On 28 October 2014, Catricalà announced that he had resigned as Section President of the Council of State to pursue a career as a lawyer and founded the "Law Academy". Subsequently he became a partner of "Studio Lipani Catricalà & Partners". On 30 June 2015 he was appointed president of the "Body for the management of the lists of financial agents and credit brokers" (Organismo per la gestione degli Elenchi degli Agenti in attività finanziaria e dei Mediatori creditizi). On 20 April 2017, he was appointed chairman of "Aeroporti di Roma SpA".

Catricalà used a revolver to commit suicide in his apartment in Rome, on 24 February 2021.

References

1952 births
2021 deaths
People from Catanzaro
Sapienza University of Rome alumni
Suicides by firearm in Italy
2021 suicides
Italian politicians who committed suicide